CXA may refer to:

CXA, the IATA code for XiamenAir, a Chinese passenger airline based in Xiamen, Fujian Province
Chinese Xiangqi Association, a member of the All-China Sports Federation promoting xiangqi